Roman Vitalyevich Monchenko (9 August 1964 – 2 January 2020) was a Russian Olympic rower  who competed for the Unified Team at the 1992 Summer Olympics and for Russia at the 1996 Summer Olympics, where he won a bronze medal as a member of the men's eight team.

References 
 
 

1964 births
2020 deaths
Soviet male rowers
Russian male rowers
Rowers at the 1992 Summer Olympics
Rowers at the 1996 Summer Olympics
Olympic rowers of the Unified Team
Olympic rowers of Russia
Olympic bronze medalists for Russia
Olympic medalists in rowing
Medalists at the 1996 Summer Olympics